Delaine Alvin "Delaney" Bramlett (July 1, 1939 – December 27, 2008) was an American singer and guitarist. He was best known for his musical partnership with his wife Bonnie Bramlett in the band Delaney & Bonnie and Friends, which included a wide variety of other musicians, many of whom were successful in other contexts.

Early life 
Bramlett was born in Pontotoc, Mississippi. He began playing guitar when he was eight years old, but didn't get serious about the instrument until he was a teenager. He started singing in school and at twelve he had a quartet. Bramlett joined the United States Navy before he was 17, serving for two and half to three years. He took boot camp at Naval Station Great Lakes, spending over half his hitch there.

After his discharge, he moved to Los Angeles in the early 1960s, where he worked as a bartender before he started performing in clubs.

Career 
Bramlett was performing at the Palomino Club in North Hollywood when he was asked to appear in a pilot for a new television show, Shindig!. By 1965, Bramlett was a regular member of the Shindogs, the show's house band. He collaborated as a songwriter with fellow musicians Joey Cooper, Mac Davis, and Jackie DeShannon. During this time, he worked with J.J. Cale and Leon Russell and released some unsuccessful solo singles. Bramlett was the first artist signed to Independence Records, headed by Phil Skaff. His debut single "Guess I Must be Dreamin" was produced by  Russell, entering the Cashbox "Looking Ahead" survey on May 14, 1967.

In the late 1960s British guitar icon Eric Clapton joined Delaney & Bonnie & Friends on tour, after which Bramlett produced and co-wrote songs for Clapton's debut solo album, Eric Clapton. Clapton has credited Bramlett for pushing him to sing and teaching him the art of rock vocals. Bramlett produced King Curtis's last album, which produced two hit singles, "Teasin'" and "Lonesome Long Way from Home".

Bramlett taught Beatles lead guitarist George Harrison to play slide guitar, prominently featured in Harrison's hit "My Sweet Lord". Bramlett wrote, recorded, or appeared on stage with many notable performers, including Joe Cocker, Jimi Hendrix, Janis Joplin, Billy Preston, John Lennon, the Everly Brothers, Duane Allman, Spooner Oldham, Steve Cropper, and Billy Burnette.

Members of the Friends appearing in concert or recording with Bramlett on Friends albums include Clapton, Harrison, Leon Russell, Curtis, Duane Allman, Gregg Allman, Dave Mason, Rita Coolidge, Carl Radle, Jim Gordon, Bobby Whitlock, Jim Keltner, Bobby Keys, and Gram Parsons.

Their album Delaney & Bonnie & Friends On Tour With Eric Clapton (1970) reached No. 29 on the Billboard 200. Between 1970 and 1972, the duo had seven songs chart on the Billboard Hot 100, including their best-known single, the poignant "Never Ending Song of Love", which peaked at No. 13 and a cover  of Dave Mason's "Only You Know and I Know", which peaked at No. 20. Delaney & Bonnie ended their professional and personal relationship in 1972.

In 2006, Bramlett was one of the duet artists on the Jerry Lee Lewis album Last Man Standing, singing and playing guitar on "Lost Highway". In 2008, Bramlett released his first CD in six years, A New Kind of Blues.  He died later that year.

Personal life 
Bramlett was married to Bonnie Lynn O'Farrell.  The couple had a daughter Bekka Bramlett, who was briefly a member of Fleetwood Mac in the mid 1990s and has had a long career as a vocalist, backing various country and pop artists and releasing several solo albums. Their marriage was marred by violence due to their cocaine addictions. They divorced in 1972, ending their musical partnership as well.

Bramlett married Kim Carmel Bramlett in 1992. They were together for 13 years, the longest relationship of Delaney's by far. Kim, a versatile musician/singer as well as chief engineer at the studio, recorded the last several albums during the period of 1989–2000. They divorced in 2001.

Bramlett died from complications of gallbladder surgery at UCLA Ronald Reagan Medical Center in Los Angeles on December 27, 2008. Surviving were his widow Susan Lanier-Bramlett; a brother, John Wayne Bramlett; three daughters, Michele Bramlett, Suzanne Bramlett, and Bekka Bramlett; and two grandchildren. He was buried at Forest Lawn, Hollywood Hills Cemetery in Los Angeles.

Legacy 
Described in an obituary as a "Southern Legend", Bramlett's song "Never Ending Song of Love" has been covered by others and was used on the soundtrack of the films RV and A Good Year. Bramlett co-wrote Clapton's hit song "Let It Rain".

Bramlett was inducted into the Mississippi Musicians Hall of Fame on January 18, 2011.

Discography

Delaney & Bonnie 
1969: Home (Stax STS-2026)
1969: Accept No Substitute [AKA The Original Delaney & Bonnie] (Elektra EKS-74039)
1970: Delaney & Bonnie & Friends On Tour with Eric Clapton (Atco SD 33-326)
1970: To Bonnie from Delaney (Atco SD 33-341)
1971: Genesis (early recordings from 1964 to 1965 and 1967) (GNP Crescendo GNPS-2054)
1971: Motel Shot (Atco SD 33-358)
1972: Country Life (Atco SD 33-383)
1972: D&B Together (Columbia KC-31377) -note: reissue of Country Life.
1972: The Best of Delaney & Bonnie (Atco SD-7014)
1990: The Best of Delaney & Bonnie (Rhino R2-70777)

Solo 
1972: Some Things Coming (Columbia KC-31631)
1973: Mobius Strip (Columbia KC-32420)
1975: Giving Birth to a Song (MGM SE-5011)
1977: Class Reunion (Prodigal P6-10017-S1)
1998: Sounds From Home (Zane ZN-1013)
2004: Sweet Inspiration (rec. 1989) (Lemon LEM-36)
2007: A New Kind of Blues (Magnolia Gold MGR-7181)

Other credits 
1969: Elvin Bishop, Best of Elvin Bishop: "Tulsa Shuffle" – Rhythm guitar, background vocals, producer
1970: The Crickets, Rockin' 50's Rock 'n' Roll – Producer
1970: Elvin Bishop, Best of Elvin Bishop: "Crabshaw" – Producer
1970: Eric Clapton, Eric Clapton – Arranger, rhythm guitar, background vocals, producer
1970: Leon Russell, Leon Russell – Guitar
1970: Dave Mason, Alone Together – Guitar, vocals
1971: John Simon, John Simon's Album – Tambourine
1972: Elvin Bishop, Rock My Soul – Guitar, vocals, producer
1972: John Hammond Jr, I'm Satisfied – Producer, vocals, guitar
1972: Eric Clapton, The History of Eric Clapton – Guitar, vocals
1972: Eric Clapton, Eric Clapton at His Best – Producer
1972: Duane Allman, An Anthology – Rhythm guitar, vocals, producer
1972: Everly Brothers, Stories We Could Tell – Guitar, vocals
1973: Jerry Lee Lewis, Sometimes a Memory Ain't Enough – Guitar, vocals
1973: Pacific Gas & Electric, Best – Producer
1973: John Ussery, Ussery – Percussion, producer, slide guitar
1973: Jerry Lee Lewis, The Session...Recorded in London – Bottleneck guitar
1974: Duane Allman, An Anthology Vol. II – Guitar, vocals
1976: Free Creek, Summit Meeting – Guitar
1978: Commander Cody, Flying Dreams – Vocals
1978: Dann Rogers, Hearts Under Fire – Background vocals
1982: Eric Clapton, Time Pieces: Best of Eric Clapton – Rhythm guitar, producer
1988: Eric Clapton, Crossroads – Guitar, vocals, producer, horn arrangements
1991: Zoo, Shakin' the Cage – Background vocals
1992: Phil Driscoll, Picture Changes – Background vocals
1992: Classic Rock Classic Rock [Cema] – Producer
1996: Heroes of Country Music, Vol. 5 – Vocals, producer
1997: Hank Thompson, Hank, Real Thing – Background vocals, National dobro
1998: Ian Whitcomb, You Turn Me On: The Very Best of Ian Whitcomb – Bass guitar
1998: T. Graham Brown, Wine into Water – Guitar, vocals
1999: Dave Mason, Ultimate Collection – Background vocals
2006: Jerry Lee Lewis, Last Man Standing, "Lost Highway" – Vocals
2006: (performer: "Attention to Me", "Coffee", "I Had to Come Back", "Something's Gotta Be Wrong") / (writer: "Attention to Me", "Coffee", "I Had to Come Back", "Something's Gotta Be Wrong")

References

External links 
[ Delaney Bramlett biography] at Allmusic
 Delaney Bramlett at MySpace

1939 births
2008 deaths
People from Pontotoc, Mississippi
Delaney & Bonnie & Friends members
Songwriters from Mississippi
Record producers from California
Burials at Forest Lawn Memorial Park (Hollywood Hills)
20th-century American singers
American rock guitarists
American male guitarists
20th-century American guitarists
Guitarists from Mississippi
20th-century American male singers
American male songwriters